Yvonne de Ligne (née Geurts, 19 September 1907 – 1952) was a Belgian figure skater. She competed in the ladies singles event at all major competitions from 1929 to 1936, including Winter Olympics, world and European championships. Her best achievements were sixth place at the 1929 and 1932 world championships and 1932 Olympics, and fifth place at the 1933 European Championships.

She was born Yvonne Geurts, and changed her last name after marrying speed skater Charles de Ligne. During World War II she fell in love with Dutch figure skater Jacob Hartog, who then lived in Antwerp. She arranged the murder of her husband, for which she was sentenced to 15 years. She was released after 6 years as she was suffering from tuberculosis, from which she died shortly thereafter.

References

1907 births
1952 deaths
Olympic figure skaters of Belgium
Figure skaters at the 1932 Winter Olympics
Figure skaters at the 1936 Winter Olympics
Sportspeople from Brussels
20th-century Belgian criminals
Mariticides
Belgian female murderers
20th-century deaths from tuberculosis
Tuberculosis deaths in Belgium
1944 murders in Belgium